Robert Buckner (May 28, 1906 – August 18, 1989) was an American film screenwriter, producer and short story writer.

Biography
Buckner studied at the University of Virginia and the University of Edinburgh. He began his professional writing career at age 20, as London correspondent for the New York World.

He wrote a play An Affair of the State; the novels Sigrid and Sergeant (1959), Tiger By the Tail (1960) and Starfire (1960); and the short story "The Man Who Won the War" (1936).

Screenwriter
Bucker joined Warner Bros as a writer. His first credit was Gold Is Where You Find It (1938). He did some uncredited work on Jezebel (1938) and wrote Love, Honor and Behave (1938), Comet Over Broadway (1939), The Oklahoma Kid (1939), and You Can't Get Away with Murder (1939).

Bucker had a big hit with Dodge City (1939) starring Errol Flynn, based on his original screenplay. He was credited on Angels Wash Their Faces (1939), and Espionage Agent (1939) was based on his story.

Bucker wrote a follow up to Dodge City, Virginia City (1940) with Flynn, and worked on the script for My Love Came Back (1940).

Bucker received acclaim for a biopic, Knute Rockne All American (1940). He did a third Western for Flynn, Santa Fe Trail (1940) and was put on a war film for Flynn, Dive Bomber (1941).

Bucker had a huge success with his script for Yankee Doodle Dandy (1942) a biopic of George M Cohan. This resulted in Bucker being promoted to producer at Warners.

Producer
Buckner's first film as producer was Gentleman Jim (1943) a biopic of Jim Corbett starring Flynn. He produced Mission to Moscow (1943) a biopic of Joseph E Davies and wrote and produced The Desert Song (1943).

Bucker made another movie with Flynn, Uncertain Glory (1944). He made God Is My Co-Pilot (1945), and wrote and produced Confidential Agent (1945) with Charles Boyer.

Buckner produced a popular Western with Flynn, San Antonio (1945). He did a biopic of the Brontë family, Devotion (1946), and did a crime drama, Nobody Lives Forever (1946).

Buckner produced a Western, Cheyenne (1947), and the prestigious stage hit Life with Father (1947).

In June 1947 Buckner left Warner Bros for Universal.

Universal
Buckner's first film at Universal was Rogues' Regiment (1948), which he wrote and produced, from a story by Buckner and director Robert Florey.

He went on to wrote and produce Sword in the Desert (1948), based on an old story of Buckner's which he had turned into a novel called Night Watch. It helped make a star of Jeff Chandler.

He wrote and produced Free for All (1949), Deported (1950), shot in Italy with Chandler, and Bright Victory (1951).

Freelance writer
Buckner provided the story for When in Rome (1952) and The Man Behind the Gun (1953). He went to England to write To Paris with Love (1955), House of Secrets (1956) and two for Warwick Films, A Prize of Gold (1956) and Safari (1956).

Buckner began writing for TV, adapting Twentieth Century and A Bell for Adano for Ford Star Jubilee.

20th Century Fox
Back in Hollywood Buckner wrote Love Me Tender (1956) at 20th Century Fox, a film best remembered as Elvis Presley's debut movie. In 1957 he wrote Sigrid and the Sergeant, his first prose in almost twenty years. The following year he wrote and produced From Hell to Texas (1958) directed by Henry Hathaway at Fox.

Also for Fox Bucker created a TV series Hong Kong (1960–61) starring Rod Taylor. It only lasted a season, Bucker produced the pilot for a follow up, Dateline: San Francisco but it did not result in a regular series.

At Disney he provided the story for Moon Pilot (1962).

Buckner went on to write episodes of The Rogues, Burke's Law, The Wackiest Ship in the Army, The Name of the Game and Bonanza. He also wrote the features Return of the Gunfighter (1967).

Later life
In his later life, Buckner lived in San Miguel de Allende, Mexico. He was a fine artist and recognized leader in the art community there. He died and was buried in San Miguel in 1989.

Works

"The Man Who Won the War", 1936 (short story)
Gold Is Where You Find It (1938) – writer
Jezebel (1938) – uncredited writer
Love, Honor and Behave (1938) – writer
Comet Over Broadway (1938)  – writer
The Oklahoma Kid (1939) – writer
Espionage Agent (1939) – writer
The Angels Wash Their Faces (1939) – writer
Dodge City (1939) – writer
You Can't Get Away with Murder (1939) – writer
Santa Fe Trail (1940) – writer
Knute Rockne All American  (1940) – writer
My Love Came Back (1940) – writer
Virginia City (1940) – writer
Dive Bomber (1941) – writer
Yankee Doodle Dandy (1942) – writer
Gentleman Jim (1942) – producer
Mission to Moscow (1943) – producer
The Desert Song (1943) – writer, producer
Roaring Guns (1944) (short) – writer
Uncertain Glory (1944) – producer
God is My Co-Pilot (1945) – producer
San Antonio (1945) – producer
Confidential Agent (1945) – writer, producer
Devotion (1946) – producer
Nobody Lives Forever (1946) – producer
Night Watch (1947) (novel) – writer – became Sword in the Desert
Cheyenne (1947) – producer
Life with Father (1947) – producer
Rogues' Regiment (1948) – writer, producer, co-story
Portrait of a Lady (1949) (play) – writer
Sword in the Desert (1949) – writer, producer
Free for All (1949) – writer, producer
Deported (1950) – writer, producer
Bright Victory (1951) – writer, producer
When in Rome (1952) – writer
The Man Behind the Gun (1953) – writer
A Prize of Gold (1955) – writer
To Paris with Love (1955) – writer
Ford Star Jubilee (1956) – various episodes – writer
Safari (1956) – writer
Love Me Tender (1956) – writer
Triple Deception (1956) – writer
Sigrid and the Sergeant (1957) (novel) – writer
From Hell to Texas (1958) – writer, producer
Hong Kong (1960–61) – creator, writer, producer
Dateline San Francisco (1962) (TV pilot) – writer
Moon Pilot (1962) – writer, based on his 1960 novel Starfire
The Rogues (1965) – various episodes – writer
Burke's Law (1965) (TV series) – various episodes – writer
The Wackiest Ship in the Army (1966) – episode "The Lamb Who Hunted Wolves" – writer
Return of the Gunfighter (1967) – writer
The Name of the Game (1969) – episode "The Suntan Mob" – writer
Bonanza (1970) – episode "The Gold Mine" - writer

References

External links

Robert Buckner at BFI

1906 births
1989 deaths
Alumni of the University of Edinburgh
University of Virginia alumni
People from Crewe, Virginia
American male screenwriters
New York World
American male short story writers
American film producers
American emigrants to Mexico
20th-century American businesspeople
20th-century American short story writers
20th-century American male writers
Screenwriters from Virginia
Robert Meltzer Award winners
20th-century American screenwriters